Zeugma Mosaic Museum, in the town of Gaziantep, Turkey, is the biggest mosaic museum in the world, containing 1700 m2 of mosaics. It opened to the public on 9 September 2011. The  museum features  of mosaic and replaces the Bardo National Museum in Tunis as the world’s largest mosaic museum.

The museum's Hellenistic Greek and Roman mosaics are focused on Zeugma, which is said to have been founded as Seleucia by Seleucus I Nicator, founder of the Seleucid Kingdom after serving as a hetairoi military officer in the army of Alexander the Great. The treasures, including the mosaics, remained relatively unknown until 2000 when artifacts appeared in museums and when plans for new dams on the Euphrates meant that much of Zeugma would be flooded. In 2011, many of the mosaics remain covered, and teams of researchers continue to work on the project.

Gallery

References

External links

 Over 500 pictures of the mosaics in organized galleries

Archaeological museums in Turkey
Art museums and galleries in Turkey
Museums in Gaziantep
Museums established in 2011
Mosaics in Turkey
Visitor attractions in Gaziantep